Delightful Story (Czech:Rozkosný príbeh) is a 1936 Czech operetta film directed by Vladimír Slavínský and starring Věra Ferbasová, Zita Kabátová and Frantisek Kristof-Veselý.

The film's sets were designed by the art director Štěpán Kopecký.

Cast
 Věra Ferbasová as Helena Veselá  
 Zita Kabátová as Miluska Kovárová  
 František Kristof-Veselý as JUDr. Jára Nerad  
 Oldřich Nový as Jaroslav Nerad  
 Růžena Šlemrová as Ema Neradová  
 Jan Pivec as Karel Dobes  
 Theodor Pistek as Ferdinand Nerad  
 Ladislav Pešek as Ferdinand Nerad  
 Stanislav Neumann as Fred Penkava  
 Adina Mandlová as Eva Randová
 Baletni Soubor Tylova Divadla as Dancers  
 Julius Batha as Bookkeeper  
 Josef Fuksa as Dancer  
 Milada Gampeová as Eva's Mother  
 Jiří Hron as Customer 
 Iska Kostalova as Dancer  
 Oldřich Kovár as Singer  
 František Krejci as Porter 
 Ota Motycka as Nerad's Servant  
 Alois Peterka as Shopkeeper  
 A. Pilsova 
 Slávka Procházková as Singer  
 Marie Ptáková 
 Selteri as Singer  
 Bozena Stehlickova as Saleswoman  
 L. Stolcova 
 Vladimír Stros as First Customer  
 Elsa Vetesníková as Bozenka

References

Bibliography
 Vladimír Opěla. Czech feature film, Volume 2. Národní filmový archiv, 1998.

External links
 

1936 films
1936 musical films
Czechoslovak musical films
Czech musical films
1930s Czech-language films
Films directed by Vladimír Slavínský
Operetta films
Czechoslovak black-and-white films
1930s Czech films